Sygnały Magazyn (Signals Magazine) was a Polish cultural and social magazine published 1933–1939 in Lwów (Lemberg, today Lviv, Ukraine).  It was a leading periodical of the leftist Polish intelligentsia. The journal started as a 12-page monthly and was subsequently published once every two weeks, with editions of up to 32 pages. Sygnały was published in the tabloid format, similar to the New York Times at about 56x40 cm (22x16 inches).

Editors 
Its editor-in-chief was Karol Kuryluk, and the editorial committee included Tadeusz Banaś, Stanisława Blumenfeld, Halina Górska, Tadeusz Hollender, Anna Kowalska, Andrzej Kurczkowski and Marian Prominski.

Polish contributors 
Among the literary contributors from Poland figured Erwin Axer, Maria Dąbrowska, Jan Kasprowicz, Stanisław Jerzy Lec, Bruno Schulz, Leopold Staff, Julian Tuwim, Debora Vogel and Józef Wittlin.

International contributors 
International literary contributors included Henri Barbusse, André Malraux, Carl von Ossietzky, Bertrand Russell, Upton Sinclair and Paul Valéry.

Artists 
The magazine featured reproductions of art work by Alexander Archipenko, Jan Cybis, Xawery Dunikowski, Max Ernst, Henryk Gotlib, Bronisław Linke, Maria Jarema, Bruno Schulz, Henryk Streng and Zygmunt Waliszewski; avant-garde photographs and photomontages by Otto Hahn, Jerzy Janisch, Margit Sielska and Mieczysław Szczuka; and caricatures by K. Baraniecki, F. Kleinmann, Eryk Lipiński and Franciszek Parecki.

History 
Special issues were dedicated to Jewish, Ukrainian and Belarusian culture.

In 1938 an armed ONR (National Radical Camp) gang raided the editorial office and Karol Kuryluk barely escaped alive. In spite of financial hardship and heavy censorship, he published Signals through August 1939.

In September 1939, after the Soviet annexation of Lwów, Kuryluk deposited his Signals archive at the Ossolineum Library (now Stefanyk Library) where it has survived until now.

Picture gallery

Sources 
 Encyklopedia Gazety Wyborczej, 2005
 Ewa Pankiewicz, Karol Kuryluk. Biografia polityczna 1910–1967, doctoral dissertation, Warsaw University.
 Prasa Polska w latach 1939–1945, Warsaw, 1980.
 Książka dla Karola (a collections of memoirs and essays on Karol Kuryluk, and his letters), ed. K. Koźniewski, Warsaw, 1984.
 Halina Górska, Chłopcy z ulic miasta, with an introduction by Karol Kuryluk, Warsaw, 1956.
 Letters and Drawings of Bruno Schulz, edited by J. Ficowski, New York, 1988.
 Ewa Kuryluk, Ludzie z powietrza—Air People, Cracow, 2002
 Ewa Kuryluk, Goldi, Warsaw, 2004
 Ewa Kuryluk, Cockroaches and Crocodiles, The Moment Magazine, July/August 2008
 Ewa Kuryluk, Frascati, Cracow, 2009 www.kuryluk.art.pl
 Source materials about Karol Kuryluk in Polish, published in Zeszytyhistoryczne, in Acrobat PDF format: http://www.marekhlasko.republika.pl/03_artykuly/Kuryluk.pdf

1933 establishments in the Soviet Union
1939 disestablishments in the Soviet Union
Biweekly magazines
Cultural magazines
Magazines published in the Soviet Union
Defunct literary magazines published in Europe
Eastern Bloc mass media
Magazines established in 1933
Magazines disestablished in 1939
Mass media in Lviv
Monthly magazines published in Russia
Polish-language magazines